A woodwind doubler (or reed doubler) is a musician who can play two or more instruments from the six woodwind families (clarinets, saxophones, oboes, bassoons, flutes and recorders or other folk or ethnic woodwind instruments (e.g. panflute, irish flute)), and can play more than one instrument during a performance. A player who plays two instruments from the same family (e.g., oboe and English horn, clarinet and bass clarinet, flute and piccolo) is also often considered a woodwind doubler, but is usually paid  less than a player who plays instruments from different families.

Longtime classical music practice has expected the non-principal player in a section to double the common auxiliary instrument (e.g., 2nd flute and piccolo; 2nd oboe and English horn). In commercial work, including Hollywood film scores and—most notably—Broadway musicals, the practice gradually evolved, with some specialists developing great expertise with multiple members of three, four, or even all five of the woodwind families noted above. In such commercial work, players are paid an additional (percentage) premium for each additional double—but hiring four or five proficient "reed doublers" is still more cost-effective to the production than hiring numerous additional players. Even before 1940, Broadway reed players were commonly expected to double three, four, or five instruments; one of the most notorious mid-century examples was the Reed III book for West Side Story (1957), requiring flute, piccolo, oboe, English horn, clarinet, bass clarinet, and tenor and baritone saxophones.

The term "doubler" applies no matter how many instruments the musician plays. Someone who plays saxophone, flute, and clarinet is not a "tripler".

References

Musical terminology
Music performance
Woodwind instruments